The women's 4 × 100 metres relay at the 2014 IPC Athletics European Championships was held at the Swansea University Stadium from 18–23 August.

Medalists

Results

T35-38

See also
List of IPC world records in athletics

References

4 x 100 metres relay
2014 in women's athletics